Don Hughes may refer to:

 James D. Hughes (born 1922), known as Don, American Air Force general
 Don B. Hughes (born 1940), member of the Maryland House of Delegates